The Tervola railway station is located in the municipality of Tervola in Lapland, Finland. The distance to the Helsinki Central railway station is 900.5 kilometres, measured via the Haapamäki and Seinäjoki railway station. The station was taken into use when the track between Kemi and Rovaniemi was completed in 1909.

All passenger trains between Kemi and Rovaniemi stop at Tervola. The station does not serve cargo traffic. The traffic control is handled remotely from the Oulu railway station. The trackyard has one drive-through side track and one loading track.

External links
 Pictures from the Tervola station

Railway stations in Lapland (Finland)
Railway stations opened in 1909